Markham—Unionville is a federal electoral district in Ontario, Canada, that has been represented in the House of Commons of Canada since 2004.

Boundaries
Markham—Unionville is located in the City of Markham within an area bordered by a line commencing at the Highway 404-407 interchange, then east along Highway 407 to McCowan Road, north on McCowan Road to 16th Avenue, east on 16th to Highway 48, then to the northern city limit, then along the northern and western city boundaries to the 404-407 interchange.

Demographics
According to the 2021 Canadian census

Ethnic groups: 66.6% Chinese, 12.1% White, 9.9% South Asian, 2% Black, 1.4% Filipino, 1.2% West Asian
Languages: 29.5% Yue, 28.4% English, 20.7% Mandarin, 1.6% Tamil
Religions: 51.2% No religion, 33.3% Christian (14.8% Catholic, 2.5% Christian Orthodox, 1.5% Baptist), 4.8% Buddhist, 4.8% Hindu, 4.8% Muslim
Median income (2020): $34,000 
Average income (2020): $52,900

History
It is located in the province of Ontario and covers suburban areas north of Toronto. It was created in 2003 from the former Markham riding. The federal riding was first represented by John McCallum until he switched to the newly formed Markham—Thornhill riding for the 2015 election. Markham—Unionville was the only seat that the Liberals lost among those they held after the 2011 election, though the riding's boundaries changed considerably and would have been won by the Conservatives in 2011 based on the redistributed results.

54% of Markham—Unionville's territory (mostly south of Highway 407) was redistributed into the new Markham—Thornhill riding for the 2015 election. The area north of Highway 407 and west of McCowan Road remained in Markham—Unionville. The new Markham—Unionville riding also gained new territoryin the northwest corner of the city of Markham which were previously in the riding of Oak Ridges—Markham. 51% of the new riding came from Oak Ridges—Markham.

Members of Parliament

The riding has elected the following Members of Parliament:

Election results

2015-present

2004-2011

See also
 List of Canadian federal electoral districts
 Past Canadian electoral districts

References

Citations

Sources 

 
 Riding history from the Library of Parliament
 2011 Results from Elections Canada
 Campaign expense data from Elections Canada

Ontario federal electoral districts
Politics of Markham, Ontario
2013 establishments in Ontario